Templo de Santa Teresa de Jesús is a church in Centro, Guadalajara, in the Mexican state of Jalisco.

References

External links

 

Buildings and structures in Guadalajara, Jalisco
Centro, Guadalajara
Churches in Mexico